Ryszard Torzecki (20 March 1925 in Łódź – 20 August 2003 in Konstancin) was a Polish historian, specializing in the Polish-Ukrainian relations. He was a member of the Institute of History of the Polish Academy of Sciences and in the 1990s he served as one of the experts to the Polish parliament (Sejm) with regards to the Polish-Ukrainian relations. He was the author of over 100 scholarly works.

1925 births
2003 deaths
20th-century Polish historians
Polish male non-fiction writers
Writers from Łódź